Begonia oxyanthera is a species of plant in the family Begoniaceae. It is found in Cameroon, Equatorial Guinea, and possibly Nigeria. Its natural habitats are subtropical or tropical moist lowland forests and subtropical or tropical moist montane forests. It is threatened by habitat loss.

References

oxyanthera
Vulnerable plants
Taxonomy articles created by Polbot